Shashibhusan Dasgupta, or Shashi Bhushan Dasgupta, Shashibhusan and Shashi Bhusan Das Gupta (1911–1964) was a Bengali scholar of philosophy, languages, literature (particularly Bengali literature), literary critic, author and theologian.

Dasgupta was born in Chandrahar Village in  modern Barisal Division, South-Central Bangladesh. He obtained his IA from B M College, Barisal, his BA (Hons) in Philosophy from Scottish Church College, Kolkata, West Bengal, India. His MA in Bengali Language and Literature was from Calcutta University in 1935, and he subsequently joined Calcutta University's Bengali Department as a Researcher. Winning the 1937 Premchand Roychand Studentship due to his scholarship contributions, Dasgupta was appointed in Bengali Department a lecturer, and received his PhD in that department in 1939.

Dasgupta's chief opus is the identification of Indian spiritual meditation forms and demonstration of their relationship to Tantric Buddhism, to Saivite, Sakta and Vaishnava religious philosophies, and to Bengali literature. He won the 1961 Sahitya Akademi Award for his work "Bharater Shakti-Sadhana O Shakta Sahitya."

Dasgupta had authored novels, plays, poems and children's books. Some editions of his works are published posthumously or in recently updated versions, and their exact or cited titles in English depend on the language variants being transliterated.

Bibliography

Religion
Obscure Religious Cults: As a Background of Bengali Literature (1946)
An Introduction to Tantric Buddhism (1950)
Aspects of Indian Religious Thought, Shriradhar Kramavikash: Darshane O Sahitye (1952)
Bhāratera śakti-sādhanā o śākta sāhitya (1960)

Literature
Shashi Bhushan Das Gupta (Ed.), A Descriptive Catalogue Of Bengali Manuscripts Preserved In The State Library Of  Cooch Behar, Published by: the Superintendent of Press, Cooch Behar State, Printed by: Nripendra Chandra Sen, At the Sabita Press, 18B, Shamacharan De Street, Calcutta, (1948)
Bangla Sahityer Nabayug
Bangla Sahityer Ekdik/Bāṅalā-sāhityera ekadika (1960)
Sahityer Svarup/Sāhityera svarūpa (1983)
Upanisader Patabhumikay Rabindramanas/Upanishadera paṭabhūmikāẏa Rabīndramānasa (1992)
Upama Kalidasasya/Upamā Kālidāsasya (1967)
Kavi Jatindranath O Adhunik Bangla Kavitar Pratham Paryay/Kabi Yatīndranātha o ādhunika Bāṅalā kabitāra prathama paryāẏa (1990)
Tolstoy Gandhi O Rabindranath/Ṭalasṭaẏa, Gāndhī, Rabīndranātha (1962)
Shilpalipi
Bharatiya Sadhanar Aikya
Bauddhadharma O Charyagiti/Bauddhadharma o caryāgīti (1964)
Hābā Haladhara (1962)
Traẏī : Bālmīki, Kalidāsa, Rabīndranātha (1989)

References 

1911 births
1964 deaths
Scottish Church College alumni
University of Calcutta alumni
Academic staff of the University of Calcutta
Religious philosophers
Writers from West Bengal

Bengali philosophers
20th-century Bengalis
20th-century Indian scholars
Bengali Hindus